Arnaldo Resega, known as Aldo Resega (16 September 1896 – 18 December 1943) was an Italian Fascist politician and soldier.

Biography

Born in Milan in 1896 from Anacleto Resega and Maria Allievi, he participated in the First World War with the rank of infantry lieutenant, receiving a Silver Medal of Military Valor for courage displayed during the battle of Caporetto. When the Arditi were created, he volunteered for service with them and obtained command a small Arditi company, which he led across the Piave river during the battle of Vittorio Veneto, capturing a large number of prisoners and earning a Bronze Medal of Military Valor.

After the end of the war, Resega became a squadrista and joined the National Fascist Party, participating in the march on Rome. In 1936 he volunteered for the Second Italo-Ethiopian War with the rank of centurione (captain), commanding an Arditi company of the 6th CC.NN. Division "Tevere" and being awarded another bronze medal of military valor. During the Second World War he participated in operations on the Western Front, the Greek-Albanian front, in Croatia and Dalmatia, reaching the rank of lieutenant colonel and receiving another silver and a bronze medal of military valor. Declared a war invalid for wounds suffered in combat, he was repatriated and on 5 June 1943 he was appointed federal inspector of the PNF in his native Milan.

 After the fall of the Fascist regime and the Armistice of Cassibile, on 13 September 1943 Resega re-established the Milanese section of the PNF, then joining the Italian Social Republic and being appointed federal secretary of the Milan section of the Republican Fascist Party. His son Gianfranco enlisted as an officer in the Republican National Guard. According to Gianni Oliva, Resega represented the "moderate" faction of the Milanese Fascists, trying to curb excesses of the most hardliner elements, led by Francesco Colombo. Nevertheless, his position as head of the Milanese fascists made him a target for the Gruppi di Azione Patriottica, and in the evening of 18 December 1943 he was ambushed and shot dead in front of his home by three GAP members. Eight anti-Fascists were executed in reprisal on the following day at the Arena Civica; the GAP in turn opened fire on Resega's funeral procession on 20 December. When the Black Brigade of Milan was established in 1944, it was named after Resega.

References

1896 births
1943 deaths
People of the Italian Social Republic
Recipients of the Silver Medal of Military Valor
Recipients of the Bronze Medal of Military Valor
Italian military personnel of World War I
Italian military personnel of World War II
Italian military personnel of the Second Italo-Ethiopian War
Deaths by firearm in Italy